David Betoun of Creich (1466–1505) was a Scottish landowner and courtier.

His family home was Creich Castle. He was keeper of Falkland Palace.

The surnames is spelled variously as "Beaton", "Betoun", or "Bethune".

He was Treasurer of Scotland in the years 1500 and 1501. In December 1496 he and Sir David Arnot bought clothes in Edinburgh for Margaret Drummond, a mistress of James IV of Scotland, and were paid for their expenses.

Family
He married Janet Duddingston. Their children included:
 Janette Betoun, who married (1) Sir Robert Livingstone and (2) James Hamilton, 1st Earl of Arran
 John Beaton, who married Jean Hay, and was the father of Robert Beaton of Creich
 Grizel Beaton, who married James Lyle, 4th Lord Lyle
 Elizabeth Beaton, who was a mistress of James V of Scotland and had a daughter Jean Stewart, Countess of Argyll, and was mother of the poet John Stewart of Baldynneis

References

15th-century Scottish people
16th-century Scottish landowners
People of Falkland Palace
1505 deaths
1466 births
Date of birth unknown
Date of death unknown